The three teams in this group played against each other on a home-and-away basis. Belgium and Bulgaria finished level on points, a play-off on neutral ground was played to decide who would qualify. The winner (Bulgaria) qualified for the eighth FIFA World Cup held in England.

Matches

 

 

 

 

 

 
Belgium and Bulgaria finished level on points, and a play-off on neutral ground was played to decide who would qualify.

Bulgaria qualified.

Final Table

Team stats

Head coach:  Constant Vanden Stock

Head coach:  Rudolf Vytlačil

Head coach:  Milovan Ćirić

External links
FIFA official page
RSSSF - 1966 World Cup Qualification
Allworldcup

1)
1964–65 in Israeli football
1965–66 in Israeli football
1964–65 in Belgian football
1965–66 in Belgian football
1964–65 in Bulgarian football
1965–66 in Bulgarian football